Lene Christensen (born 4 February 2000) is a Danish footballer who plays as a goalkeeper for Rosenborg in the Toppserien and the Danish national team.

Club career 
Christensen started her senior career for Kolding Q in the Elite division. From the 2018–19 season covered the goal in the club as first choice. After six and a half years at the club, she switched in the winter transfer window in January 2022 to Norwegian top club Rosenborg BK on a 2-year contract.

She has also been named the season's best goalkeeper in the Gjensidige Kvindeligaen twice in a row, in 2019/20 and 2020/21.

International career
She made her debut for the national football team of Denmark on 1 December 2020 in the last UEFA Euro 2022 qualifying match in group B which was against Italy on home ground in Viborg, the match resulted in 0–0 draw. She has also appeared for the Danish national under-16 team and Danish national junior team, several times. In 2019, she made her debut for the Denmark national under-23 team, against Netherlands.

She made her debut for Denmark's senior national team on 1 December 2020 in the European Championship qualifier against Italy, which ended in a draw. Since then, she has become the clear first choice in the national team and was subsequently, on 16 June 2022, selected for national coach Lars Søndergaard's squad for the European Championship 2022 in England.

Honours

Club
KoldingQ
 Danish Cup
 Runners-up: 2018

References

External links
 
 
 
 

2000 births
Living people
Danish women's footballers
Denmark women's international footballers
Women's association football midfielders
UEFA Women's Euro 2022 players
Denmark international footballers
Association football midfielders
Denmark women's youth international footballers